Harald Tammer (9 January 1899 – 6 June 1942) was an Estonian journalist, athlete and weightlifter. As a heavyweight weightlifter he won a world title in 1922 and a bronze medal at the 1924 Olympics. As an athlete he competed in the shot put at the 1920 and 1924 Olympics and came sixth and twelfth, respectively. He served as the Olympic flag bearer for Estonia in 1920, and as a representative of the Estonian Olympic team in 1928 and 1936.

Career
In 1915 Tammer graduated from Tallinn Commerce School and joined the Sports Association Kalev. Next year he placed within the podium at the Russian championships in shot put, discus throw and hammer throw. Soon after that he volunteered to fight in World War I and Estonian War of Independence as member of the Estonian Defence Leagues  in Tallinn. After demobilization, from 1921 to 1928 he edited the Estonian sports newspaper Eesti Spordileht, and in 1923–33 was a journalist and in 1933–1940 editor-in-chief of Eesti Päevaleht. In 1928–40 he was a board member of Estonian Journalists Union, and in 1934–35 headed the Baltic Journalists Union. Tammer studied 
law and diplomacy at the École Libre des Sciences Politiques in Paris in 1931–33. He was also a board member of the Estonian National Olympic Committee in 1933–40, and of the Estonian Parliament in 1937–40. In 1940 he briefly worked as editor of the magazine Revue Baltique. Next year he was accused of spying for the Estonian Defence Forces and deported to Russia. He died in 1942 in a Gulag prison camp near Sukhobezvodnoye station in Semyonovsky District of Nizhny Novgorod Oblast.

Awards
 21 February 1940 Order of the Estonian Red Cross II class (et: Eesti Punase Risti Teenetemärk II klass)
 18 June 1936 Order of the Estonian Red Cross II class I (et:Eesti Punase Risti mälestusmärk II järgu I aste)
1924 Order of Lāčplēsis nr.3/1816

References

External links

Short biography –  Members of Tallinn Rotary Club 1930–40
What Happened to Rotary and rotarians in 1940 and 1941 in Estonia and the Baltic States

1899 births
1942 deaths
Sportspeople from Tallinn
People from the Governorate of Estonia
Members of the Estonian National Assembly
Estonian journalists
20th-century Estonian lawyers
Estonian male weightlifters
Estonian male shot putters
Estonian male discus throwers
Estonian male hammer throwers
Athletes (track and field) at the 1920 Summer Olympics
Athletes (track and field) at the 1924 Summer Olympics
Weightlifters at the 1924 Summer Olympics
Olympic athletes of Estonia
Olympic weightlifters of Estonia
Olympic bronze medalists for Estonia
Olympic medalists in weightlifting
Medalists at the 1924 Summer Olympics
Estonian military personnel of the Estonian War of Independence
Estonian people who died in Soviet detention
People who died in the Gulag
World Weightlifting Championships medalists
20th-century journalists